The 2015 Campeonato de la Victoria or 2015 Torneo de la Victoria was held at the Secretaria Nacional de Deportes in Asunción, organized by Federación Paraguaya de Atletismo. It was the 65th edition.

The competition serves as the Paraguayan Athletics Championships in track and field for the Republic of Paraguay, being the country's most important national athletics competitions.

Paraguay Marathon Club was crowned champion of the championships, where it achieved a score of 139. Larson Giovanni Diaz Martinez and María Caballero were the best athletes of the championships.

Results
Results of the competition were published on the official website of the Federación Paraguaya de Atletismo.

Men's

High jump

Long jump

Triple jump

Shot put throw

Discus throw

Javelin throw

Hammer throw

Women's

High jump

Long jump

Triple jump

Shot put throw

Discus throw

Javelin throw

Hammer throw

See also
 Sport in Paraguay
 Paraguayan Olympic Committee
 Paraguayan Athletics Federation
 Paraguayan records in athletics
 List of athletics clubs in Paraguay

References

Paraguayan Athletics Championships
2015 in Paraguayan sport
Sport in Asunción
September 2015 sports events in South America
2010s in Asunción